The Civic-Military Directory was a political body which ruled El Salvador from 25 January 1961 until 25 January 1962.

Its members were:

 Aníbal Portillo (whole time)              
 Feliciano Avelar (whole time)
 José Antonio Rodríguez Porth  (until 6 April 1961)
 José Francisco Valiente (until 6 April 1961)
 Julio Adalberto Rivera Carballo (until 11 September 1961)
 Mariano Castro Morán (from 11 September 1961)

References 

Government of El Salvador
Military dictatorships
1961 in El Salvador
1962 in El Salvador